Edmund Lanziner (born 3 March 1959) is an Italian bobsledder. He competed in the two man and the four man events at the 1980 Winter Olympics.

References

External links
 

1959 births
Living people
Italian male bobsledders
Olympic bobsledders of Italy
Bobsledders at the 1980 Winter Olympics
Place of birth missing (living people)
People from Neumarkt, South Tyrol
Sportspeople from Südtirol